WOFT-LD (channel 8) is a low-power television station in Orlando, Florida, United States, affiliated with Retro TV and owned by Bridge Media Networks. The station's transmitter is located in unincorporated Bithlo, Florida.

History 
The station's construction permit was initially a digital companion channel issued on March 9, 2005 under the calls of W08EA. On February 29, 2008, it was reassigned the callsign WOFT-LP. On June 6, 2011, it moved to the current callsign WOFT-LD.

Sale to Bridge Media Networks
On October 24, 2022, Bridge Media Networks, the parent company of 24/7 headline news service NewsNet (backed by Eric Wotila and 5-hour Energy creator Manoj Bhargava) announced it would acquire WOFT-LD from Budd Broadcasting for $1.1 million. At this time, there are no plans for NEWSnet to move its subchannel affiliation from WSWF-LD (channel 10) to WOFT-LD upon closing of the said transaction. The sale was consummated on January 4, 2023.

Technical information

Subchannels
The station's digital signal is multiplexed:

References 

Low-power television stations in the United States
OFT-LD
Television channels and stations established in 2005
2005 establishments in Florida
Retro TV affiliates
Heartland (TV network) affiliates
Rev'n affiliates
Classic Reruns TV affiliates